NME Radio is a radio station operated under NME magazine branding, that broadcast an  alternative music format. It first began broadcasting on 24 June 2008 and ceased on 25 March 2013. The station was then revived in 2018 on NME's website. There are now two radio stations, NME 1 and NME 2, that broadcast 24 hours a day.

History 

Initial plans for an NME-branded radio station were revealed to the media in late 2007 by Sammy Jacob, creator of XFM, who left the station following its purchase by Global Radio. The station began operating under licence soon after by DX Media, a company operated by Jacob.

Broadcast from studios in the Blue Fin Building in South Bank, London, also home to IPC Media, NME Radio was launched on 24 June 2008 with its first track being "Knights of Cydonia" by British rock band Muse. The presenting line-up at launch included Neil Cole and Claire Sturgess

On Friday 11 June 2010, almost two years after its launch, The Guardian reported that NME Radio was to cease broadcasting on DAB digital radio, Sky, Virgin Media and Freesat platforms, and would revert to an online only "jukebox" format after DX Media had decided to end the agreement to operate the service.

On 21 July 2010, IPC Media signed a new licence agreement with local radio group Town and Country Broadcasting. NME Radio relaunched in September 2010 and returned to some regional digital audio broadcasting (DAB) multiplexes. The station returned to Freesat and Sky, where it was available until 5 December 2011. Following the new licensing agreement, operation sites were split between IPC Media's London HQ and Town and Country Broadcasting's station in south Wales, Nation Radio.

The Town and Country incarnation of the station ceased broadcasting on 25 March 2013 at midday.

NME Radio relaunched in 2018 with two stations, NME 1 and NME 2, taking over online from Sammy Jacob's Camden Xperience Radio channels (CDNX), which were operated on a trial basis, with the idea that CDNX would be relaunched at a later date on DAB in the London area. The two NME channels are broadcast 24/7, with regular news bulletins and features. They can be heard online, via various radio playing services or through the NME website and found on DAB with both stations broadcasting on local multiplexes in Norwich and Brighton, and with NME 1 broadcasting alongside sister service CDNX in London.

Programming 
Under the control of DX Media, NME Radio featured 16 hours of live broadcasting with a variety of presenters. Following the purchase of the stations by Town and Country Broadcasting, some daytime programmes were initially introduced.
NME2 seems to have more of an orientation towards black music than does NME1.

Availability (at time of demise) 
 Online
 DAB radio – Cardiff & Newport Multiplex, Berkshire & North Hampshire Multiplex.

References

External links 
 Current NME Radio Website
 Official Website - nmeradio.com (now redirects to main NME site)

Radio stations established in 2008
Internet radio stations in the United Kingdom
Satellite radio stations
New Musical Express
2008 establishments in the United Kingdom